N(alpha)-acetyltransferase 35, NatC auxiliary subunit is a protein in humans that is encoded by the NAA35 gene.

References